Lama-Kara is the full name for the town of Kara in the Kara Region of north Togo.

External links

Falling Rain

Populated places in Kara Region